Europe's Strongest Man is an annual strength athletics competition which began in 1980. The event is held in various locations throughout Europe, and features exclusively European strongman competitors. Mariusz Pudzianowski holds the record for most wins with 6 titles. Hafþór Júlíus Björnsson holds 5 titles, Geoff Capes, Riku Kiri, Žydrūnas Savickas each hold 3 titles & Jón Páll Sigmarsson, Jamie Reeves, Manfred Hoeberl, Jouko Ahola each hold 2 titles. As of 2010, the Europe's Strongest Man contest has become a part of the Giants Live season of annual grand prix events. The contest serves as a qualifying event for the World's Strongest Man contest, with the top 3 placings qualifying for that year's WSM contest.

Championship breakdown

Notes
All names from either Dave Horne's world of grip or Body.Builder.hu except those specified by Note 1

Championships by country

Repeat champions

References

External links
Europe's Strongest Man official website
David Horne's World of Grip

 
Recurring sporting events established in 1980
1980 establishments in England